This is a list of Australian films of the 1930s. For a complete alphabetical list, see :Category:Australian films.

1930s

See also
 1930 in Australia
 1931 in Australia
 1932 in Australia
 1933 in Australia
 1934 in Australia
 1935 in Australia
 1936 in Australia
 1937 in Australia
 1938 in Australia
 1939 in Australia

External links
 Australian film at the Internet Movie Database

 
 
1930s
Australian
Films